William "Bill" 'Ernie' H. Hopper (birth registered fourth ¼ 1922 – September 2008) was a Welsh professional rugby league footballer who played in the 1940s and 1950s.

Background
William Hopper's birth was registered in Bridgend, Wales, and he died aged 85 in Castleford, England.

Playing career

International honours
Hopper won a cap for Wales while at Leeds in 1953.

Challenge Cup Final appearances
Bill Hopper played right-, i.e. number 10, in Leeds' 9–7 victory over Barrow in the 1956–57 Challenge Cup Final during the 1956–57 season at Wembley Stadium, London on Saturday 11 May 1957.

Genealogical information
Bill Hopper's marriage to Patricia (née Thorpe) was registered during first ¼ 1951 in Leeds district. They had children; Miriam Hopper (birth registered during fourth ¼  in Leeds district), and Haydn E. W. Hopper (birth registered during second ¼  in Leeds district).

References

External links
Bill Hopper RIP
Statistics at wolvesplayers.thisiswarrington.co.uk

1922 births
2008 deaths
Leeds Rhinos players
Rugby league players from Bridgend
Rugby league props
Wales national rugby league team players
Warrington Wolves players
Welsh rugby league players